The 1897–98 Johns Hopkins men's ice hockey season was the 4th season of play for the program.

Season
Johns Hopkins played a rather large number of games, especially for their time. All 17 games were played at the North Avenue Ice Palace, however, because most of their opponents also called the building home, JHU only played two home games. The team played in the Baltimore Hockey League and played an unbalanced schedule against their four league opponents.

The following November machinery that was used for the ice surface was removed from the arena. This left JHU without a home and with interest in the team having dropped precipitously over the previous few years the program was shuttered. Johns Hopkins would not play another organized game of ice hockey for about 90 years and, as of 2020, it has yet to field another varsity team.

Johns Hopkins athletic teams did not receive a moniker until 1920.

Roster

Standings

Schedule and Results

|-
!colspan=12 style=";" | Regular Season

References

Johns Hopkins
Johns Hopkins
Johns Hopkins
Johns Hopkins